The 4th (Quetta) Division was an infantry division of the British Indian Army. It was formed by General Kitchener while he was Commander-in-chief of India. During World War I the division remained in India. Its composition was:

Formation 1914
Commanding officer Lt General Malcolm Henry Grover
1st Quetta Infantry Brigade Brigadier General Sitwell
2nd Battalion Somerset Light Infantry
12th Pioneers
19th Punjabis
58th Vaughn's Rifles
1/7th Gurkha Rifles
2/7th Gurkha
XXI Brigade Royal Field Artillery (RFA)
2nd Quetta Infantry Brigade Major General Mellis VC
2nd Battalion Royal Irish Fusiliers
40th Pathans
67th Punjabis
106th Hazara Pioneers
114th Mahrattas
IV Mountain Brigade Royal Garrison Artillery (RGA)
Karachi Brigade Brigadier General Shaw
1st Battalion Lancashire Fusiliers
127th Baluch Light Infantry
69 Company RGA
Divisional troops
10th Duke of Cambridge's Own Lancers (Hodson's Horse)
22nd Cavalry (Frontier Force)
28th Light Cavalry
15th Sikhs
29th Punjabis
31st Punjabis
60 Company RGA

See also

 List of Indian divisions in World War I

References

Bibliography

External links
 

Indian World War I divisions
Military units and formations established in 1903
British Indian Army divisions
Quetta District